Didier Bionaz (born 22 February 2000) is an Italian biathlete. He has competed in the Biathlon World Cup since 2020.

Career results

World Championships

References

External links

2000 births
Living people
People from Aosta
Italian male biathletes
Biathletes at the 2022 Winter Olympics
Olympic biathletes of Italy
Sportspeople from Aosta Valley
Biathlon World Championships medalists